Erik Johan Mattias "Notan" Norström (born 2 January 1972) is a Swedish retired professional ice hockey defenceman, currently working for the AIK organization.  Norström began his National Hockey League career with the New York Rangers.  However, he is most noted for his ten seasons as a member of the Los Angeles Kings for whom he served as team captain from 2001–2007; he was the team's first non-North American-born captain. Norström played the final season of his NHL career for the Dallas Stars.

Playing career

AIK
As a youngster, he played for several years in the "talent factory" Huddinge IK although this original club was Mälarhöjden/Bredäng Hockey. In his teens he moved from Huddinge to AIK (Stockholm), where he started playing in the senior team from 1991. He was drafted in the second round, 48th overall, by the New York Rangers in the 1992 NHL Entry Draft and began his NHL career in 1993 with that team.

NHL
Norström split his time in the Rangers organization between the parent club and their American Hockey League (AHL) affiliate, the Binghamton Rangers. On 14 March 1996, he was traded with Nathan LaFayette, Ian Laperrière, Ray Ferraro and a draft pick to the Los Angeles Kings for Marty McSorley, Jari Kurri and Shane Churla. In Los Angeles he developed into a solid stay-at-home defender and anchor of the Kings' blueline. On 1 October 2001, he was appointed team captain after Rob Blake had been traded to the Colorado Avalanche.

During the NHL lockout in 2004–05, Norström played with his previous Swedish team, AIK. The team was playing in the third-tier league, struggling to advance, when Norström arrived. He helped lead them through the playoffs, and to secure a spot in the second tier league the following year.

Norström was originally appointed to the Swedish national team for the 2006 Olympic Games in Turin but had to withdraw due to injury.

When Rob Blake returned to the Kings on 1 July 2006, Norström called him and offered the captaincy back. Blake refused at his presentation press conference and told the media that he regarded "Matty" as the obvious captain and the "core and soul" of the Kings.

Norström was acquired by the Dallas Stars through a trade with the Kings on 27 February 2007, which sent defencemen Jaroslav Modrý and Johan Fransson, a 2008 first round draft pick, a 2007 second round draft pick, and a 2007 third round draft pick to Los Angeles in exchange for Norström, forward Konstantin Pushkarev, a 2007 third round pick, and a 2007 fourth round pick.

On 30 April 2008, he scored the game-winning goal (and first NHL playoff goal of his career) in the first overtime against the San Jose Sharks, allowing the Stars to take a 3–0 series lead.

On 10 June 2008, Norström announced his retirement from hockey. On 20 June 2011, Norström joined the AIK organization as a sports manager and sounding board for Anders Gozzi.

Career achievements
 1992 IIHF – Silver medal World Junior Ice Hockey Championships
 1997 IIHF – Silver medal Ice Hockey World Championship
 1998 Winter Olympics
 1998 IIHF – Gold medal World Championships
1999 NHL All-Star 1999 National Hockey League All-Star Game
 2002 Winter Olympics
 2003 IIHF – Silver medal Ice Hockey World Championship
2004 NHL All-Star 2004 National Hockey League All-Star Game

Career statistics

Regular season and playoffs

International

References

External links

 

1972 births
AIK IF players
Binghamton Rangers players
Dallas Stars players
Huddinge IK players
Ice hockey players at the 1998 Winter Olympics
Ice hockey players at the 2002 Winter Olympics
Living people
Los Angeles Kings players
National Hockey League All-Stars
New York Rangers draft picks
New York Rangers players
Olympic ice hockey players of Sweden
Ice hockey people from Stockholm
Swedish expatriate ice hockey players in the United States
Swedish ice hockey defencemen